Heliophanus charlesi is a jumping spider species in the genus Heliophanus.  It was first described by Wanda Wesołowska in 2003 and lives in South Africa.

References

Endemic fauna of South Africa
Salticidae
Spiders of South Africa
Spiders described in 2003
Taxa named by Wanda Wesołowska